Tabango, officially the Municipality of Tabango, is a 4th class municipality in the province of Leyte, Philippines. According to the 2020 census, it has a population of 33,868 people.

Tabango, with annual income of P 34 million, has 13 barangays (villages), with 26 elementary schools, 4 high schools and one satellite school, the Palompon Institute of Technology.

Etymology
Tabango was originally a barrio named Tandaya. Most of its inhabitants lived near the seashore. One day, a man living in the barrio went to catch some crabs as swamps surrounded the place and crabs were abundant. Although he was an expert in catching crabs, he was accidentally bitten by a big one. A Spanish soldier happened to be near the place where the man was, so he came near and asked for the name of the place. The man bitten by the crab looked up and saw the soldier. Feeling the pain caused by the biting of the crab, he cried, “ Tabang mo,” which means help me. The soldier, thinking it was the name of then place, said, “ Ah, Tabango. “ The soldier repeated the word Tabango to his superiors and from that time on, the settlement was called Tabango. When the barrio was created a municipality, it retained its name.

History
In 1957 the sitios of Gibacungan, Catmon and Manlawa-an were converted into barrios.

On January 17, 2008, Tabango Mayor Bernard Jonathan Remandaban opened (soft) the almost complete P 5.8 million modern, fully air-conditioned library: “It took us 6 years to construct our municipal library.”  The library can accommodate 20,000 books, has 5 computer units with Internet access and a flat television set that only carries the National Geographic and Discovery Channels. Students can use the computers for 10 hours monthly, free of charge.

Tabango was a barrio of San Isidro, Leyte. Its early settlers came from the islands of Cebu and Bohol and from the towns of Villaba and Palompon. Later as the transportation improved same personage from the eastern side of Leyte Province found fortune in the place. These people were responsible in molding its culture.

During the Second World War, the Barrio of Tabango was made as the seat of the Civil Government of the Municipality of San Isidro, Leyte, the civil authorities returned the seat of the Local Government to the Poblacion of San Isidro, Leyte

In 1948, prominent residents of Tabango, took the opportunity offered by the late Jose L. Alvarez to work out in Manila thru Senate President Mariano Jesus Cuenco, the establishment of a new political unit. Documentation were initiated with the assistance of the Late Rosendo Homerez of Tacloban City, whose wife was native of Tugas, now a barangay of Tabango. Eventually, Executive Order No. 284 was signed by His Excellency President Elpidio Quirino on October 15, 1949, creating the Municipality of Tabango, Leyte. The first set of officials were appointed and sworn to office on January 16, 1950, to wit: Francisco Pastor (Municipal Mayor); Felomino Ocubillo (Municipal Vice Mayor); Adolfo Alvarez, Honofre Damayo, Potenciano Pijo, Mauricio Sevilles, Mateo Pastor (Councilmen).

The doctrine in the case of Pelaez vs. the Auditor General, G.R. No. L-23825 promulgated on December 24, 1965, placed the Municipality of Tabango in a great dilemma. It was in this case that the Supreme Court ruled and declared certain orders creating municipalities unconstitutional on the ground that the creation of municipalities is an exercise of the legislative power. On this premise, creation and exercise of the Municipality of Tabango, Leyte was illegal. However, the cloud that darkened the juridical personality of Tabango as a municipal corporation disappeared with the introduction of House Bill No. 2042 during the seventh congress by the Congressman Marcelino R. Veloso, Representative of the 3rd District Leyte. The bill proposed to create the municipalities of Almeria, Cabucgayan, Tabango and Culaba, with retroactive effect in order to validate the existence of the aforementioned municipal corporations. The bill was finally approved into law on June 17, 1972, as Republic Act 6488 retroactive on October 15, 1949.

Geography

Barangays
Tabango is politically subdivided into 13 barangays.
 Butason I
 Butason II
 Campokpok
 Catmon
 Gimarco
 Gibacungan
 Inangatan
 Manlawaan
 Omaganhan
 Poblacion
 Santa Rosa
 Tabing
 Tugas

Climate

Demographics

Economy

Tourism
Among sites that is visited by tourist are:

 Boho Beach & Bat Cave - A stretch of white sand, quaint native cottages, and a fresh water spring; marvel at thousands of fruit-eating bats in an out of the way bat cave where folklore says that the cave tunnel connects with another cave entrance in the San Vincente Ferrer Pilgrimage Site.
 San Vicente Ferrer Pilgrimage Site & Pangpang Cave - Said to be miraculous, pilgrims from all over the Philippines flock to this religious site to pray, give thanks and pay homage.
 Ocean Pearl Cove Resort - Belt out a song at any of the three Videoke Bars, jet ski to the sunset, experience the thrill of the banana boat ride, speedboat or pedal boat to an adjacent island, loll out on floating cottages, frolic in the swimming pool, relax in luxurious digs, and enjoy sumptuous meals and exotic drinks from the restaurant and the bar.
 Dawahon Isle - A rocky promontory of secluded alcoves, tiny white beaches and crystal clear waters teeming with spectacular and colorful marine life.
 Sunset Canturaw - Highest peak hereabouts, landmark for fishermen at sea, with a 500-step climb to the site of the Tabango Observatory Point Summit (TOPS).

Education
Tabango has 26 elementary schools, 4 high schools and one satellite school, the Palompon Institute of Technology.

Elementary schools

 Butason I Elementary School
 Butason II Primary School
 Campokpok CS
 Caramcam Primary School
 Catmon Elementary School
 Colonia Elementary School
 Don Bernardo Elementary School
 Gibacungan Elementary School
 Gimarco Elementary School
 Inangatan Primary School
 Kawayan Primary School
 Leon-ito Primary School
 Leoncio Erejer MPS
 Manlawaan Elementary School
 Omaganhan Elementary School
 Pining Paglingap Elementary School
 Sambulawan Elementary School
 Santa Rosa Elementary School
 Tabango North CS
 Tabayla Elementary School
 Tabing Elementary School
 Tahad Primary School
 Tugas Elementary School
 Ybanez Elementary School

Secondary school
 Gibacungan National High School
 Marcelino R. Veloso NHS (Marcelino R. Veloso NHS)
 Pastor Salazar National High School
 Tabango National High School

College
 Palompon Institute of Technology-Tabango Campus

References

External links
 [ Philippine Standard Geographic Code]
Philippine Census Information
Local Governance Performance Management System

Municipalities of Leyte (province)
Establishments by Philippine executive order